Ianthasaurus is an extinct genus of small edaphosaurids from the Late Carboniferous.

Description

Ianthasaurus lacks many of the spectacular specializations seen in Edaphosaurus. For example, the marginal dentition of Ianthasaurus is similar to that of insectivorous reptiles, with slender conical teeth which are slightly recurved at the tips, and there is a slight development of a caniniform region. The palatal and mandibular dentition is unspecialized, and there are no batteries of teeth for crushing of plant materials. Also unlike Edaphosaurus, Ianthasaurus was lightly built and was probably quite agile. The skull was similar to that of Haptodus, a sphenacodontid, though they were distantly related.

Discovery
It was named by Robert R. Reisz and David Berman in 1986. It was discovered by them in the Upper Pennsylvanian Rock Lake Shale near Garnett, Kansas.

See also

 List of pelycosaurs

References

Edaphosaurids
Prehistoric synapsid genera
Carboniferous synapsids
Carboniferous synapsids of North America
Taxa named by Robert R. Reisz
Fossil taxa described in 1986